Donald Bousfield (9 April 1914 – 13 April 2001) was an English cricketer. He played two first-class matches for Cambridge University Cricket Club in 1935.

See also
 List of Cambridge University Cricket Club players

References

External links
 

1914 births
2001 deaths
English cricketers
Cambridge University cricketers
People from Broxbourne
Hertfordshire cricketers
Buckinghamshire cricketers